Nancy Novotny is an American radio personality and voice actress working with ADV Films and Seraphim Digital, known for her roles in English-language dubbed anime, such as Yomi in Azumanga Daioh, Yuka in Elfen Lied and Madlax in Madlax. She co-hosts a weekly show on Rice Radio in Houston, Texas.

History
She got into the voice acting industry after being influenced by Ranma ½, which resulted in auditions for A.D. Vision before being accepted for her first role in Azumanga Daioh as Yomi.

Filmography

Anime
 009-1 - Freya
 Air Gear - Mari Tomita (a.k.a. Ton-chan)
 AKB0048 - Haruna Kojima the 8th, Mother Motomiya
 Area 88 (TV) - Kitri Parveneh
 Azumanga Daioh - Koyomi "Yomi" Mizuhara (debut)
 Best Student Council - Sayuri Hida
 Blade of the Phantom Master - Sando/Chun Hyang
 Brynhildr in the Darkness - Kashiwagi
 Coyote Ragtime Show - July
 D.N.Angel - Ritsuko Fukuda
 Dog & Scissors - Sakura Honda
 Elfen Lied - Yuka
 From the New World - Masayo Komatsuzaki
 Full Metal Panic? Fumoffu - Ren Mikihara
 Girls und Panzer - Oryo/Takeko Nogami
 Godannar - Sakura
 Hakkenden: Eight Dogs of the East - Ayane Saiki, Yukihime (Snow Princess)
 Hamatora - Koneko
 Kaleido Star - Mia Guillem
 Little Busters! - Miyuki Koshiki (Ep. 25), Rei Kawagoe, Ami (Ep. 24)
 Maburaho - Raika Nario
 Madlax - Madlax
 Magical Warfare - Momoka Shijou
 Majestic Prince - Mayu
 Maria Holic - Ayari Shiki
 Moeyo Ken (TV) - Kaoru Okita
 Momo: The Girl God of Death - Daniel
 Nanaka 6/17 - Chie Kazamatsuri
 Peacemaker - Hana
 Phi Brain: Puzzle of God - Eve Gram 
 Problem Children are Coming from Another World, aren't they? - Asuka Kudou
 Rozen Maiden Zurücksplen - Nori Sakurada
 Sister Princess - Rin Rin
 Tactics - Reiko
 Tamako Market - Hinako Kitashirakawa
 The Super Dimension Fortress Macross - Vanessa Laird
 The World God Only Knows - Miyako Terada
 Tokyo Magnitude 8.0 - Mayu, Hina Kusakabe (Ep. 6)
 Tsuritama - Sakura Usami
 UFO Ultramaiden Valkyrie - Hydra, Akidora (Akidra)
 Upotte!! - L85A1 (Elle)
 Utawarerumono - Gura
 Wandaba Style - Ayame Akimo
 Venus Versus Virus - Shizu
 Yugo the Negotiator - Mariko
 Yumeria - Nanase Senjou

Production credits

ADR Script
 Muv-Luv Alternative: Total Eclipse 
 Tamako Market

References

External links
 
Nancy Novotny at the Internet Movie Database

American voice actresses
Living people
Year of birth missing (living people)
Rice University people
People from Houston
American people of Russian descent
21st-century American women